Sitotroga exquisita is a moth of the family Gelechiidae. It was described by Oleksiy V. Bidzilya and Wolfram Mey in 2011. It is found Namibia.

References

Moths described in 2011
Sitotroga